Fabian Zetterlund (born August 25, 1999) is a Swedish professional ice hockey forward for the San Jose Sharks of the National Hockey League (NHL). He was selected by the New Jersey Devils in the third round, 63rd overall, of the 2017 NHL Entry Draft.

Playing career
Zetterlund played his youth hockey within the program of Färjestad BK. He made his Swedish Hockey League debut playing a solitary game with Färjestad BK during the 2015–16 SHL season.

During the 2018–19 season with Färjestad, Zetterlund suffered a knee injury limiting him to just 16 games, recording two goals and four points. On May 13, 2019, Zetterlund was signed by the New Jersey Devils to a three-year, entry-level contract. On October 24, 2020, the Devils loaned Zetterlund to AIK of HockeyAllsvenskan.

Entering the 2022–23 season, Zetterlund remained with the Devils and was named to the season-opening roster. Establishing new offensive highs with the Devils, Zetterlund collected six goals and 20 points through 45 regular season games, before he was traded six days prior to the NHL trade deadline, to the San Jose Sharks along with Andreas Johnsson, Nikita Okhotiuk, Shakir Mukhamadullin, and three Devils draft picks in exchange for Timo Meier and Scott Harrington and three prospects and a pick on February 26, 2023.

Career statistics

Regular season and playoffs

International

References

External links
 

1999 births
Living people
AIK IF players
Binghamton Devils players
Färjestad BK players
New Jersey Devils draft picks
New Jersey Devils players
Sportspeople from Karlstad
San Jose Sharks players
Swedish ice hockey forwards
Timrå IK players
Utica Comets players